The 1974–75 Shatt al-Arab conflict took place between the Imperial State of Iran and Ba'athist Iraq from April 1974 to March 1975, and occurred as a direct result of their territorial dispute in the region. It was concentrated around the Shatt al-Arab, a river in Western Asia that partly flows along the Iran–Iraq border. The conflict took place over the course of 11 months and resulted in over 1,000 total casualties. It was the most significant spike of bilateral tensions between Iran and Iraq over the Shatt al-Arab waterway before the protracted Iran–Iraq War in the 1980s following the Iranian Revolution and the subsequent establishment of the Islamic Republic of Iran.

Background

Qajar Iran had repudiated the demarcation line established in the Persian Gulf by the Anglo-Ottoman Convention of 1913, and argued that the Iran–Iraq border in the Shatt al-Arab should be demarcated according to the thalweg principle. In 1934, the Hashemite Kingdom of Iraq, encouraged by the United Kingdom, took Pahlavi Iran to the League of Nations, but the dispute was not resolved. In 1937, Iran and Iraq signed their first official boundary treaty, which established the waterway border on the eastern bank of the river and excluded a four-mile anchorage zone near Abadan—which was allotted to Iran—where the border ran along the thalweg. In 1958, Iraq's Hashemite monarchy was overthrown in a coup d'état known as the 14 July Revolution, which established the First Iraqi Republic. In 1968, another coup d'état—staged by the Arab Socialist Ba'ath Party and known as the 17 July Revolution—deposed the First Iraqi Republic and firmly established a Ba'athist regime in Iraq. Shortly afterwards, Iran sent a delegation of diplomats to Iraq in 1969, and when the erstwhile Iraqi government refused to proceed with negotiations over a new treaty, Iran withdrew the treaty of 1937. The Iranian abrogation of the 1937 treaty marked the beginning of a period of acute tension in Iran–Iraq relations that lasted until the 1975 Algiers Agreement.

Events
From March 1974 to March 1975, Iran and Iraq fought border skirmishes sparked over Iran's support of Iraqi Kurds, who were engaged in an insurgency against the Arab-majority Iraqi state for secession and the establishment of an independent Kurdish state. In 1975, the Iraqis launched a major military offensive into Iran, spearheaded with tank columns; this incursion was defeated by the Iranians, after which several other attacks took place. However, Iran had the world's fifth-largest military at the time and promptly defeated the Iraqi military with its air power, while continuing to frustrate the Iraqis domestically with its arming of Kurdish separatists alongside its erstwhile close allies: the United States and Israel. Some 1,000 people died as a result of the 1974–75 conflict around the Shatt al-Arab, and Iraq was ultimately unable to gain any advantage against Iran.

Consequently, Iraq decided against continuing the conflict, and chose instead to make concessions to Tehran to end the Kurdish rebellion. In the 1975 Algiers Agreement, Iraq made territorial concessions—including the Shatt al-Arab waterway—in exchange for normalized bilateral relations. In return for Iraq recognizing that the frontier on the waterway ran along the entire thalweg as per Iran's argument, the latter ended its support for Iraqi Kurdish guerrillas.

Aftermath

On 17 September 1980, Iraq abrogated the 1975 Algiers Agreement after Iranian forces shelled a number of Iraqi border posts on 4 September following the 1979 Iranian Revolution, which overthrew the Shah and established an Islamic theocracy. Iraqi President Saddam Hussein claimed that the newly-established Islamic Republic of Iran had refused to abide by the stipulations of the Algiers Accords and Iraq therefore considered them null and void. Tensions began to run high between the two states as Iraq's ruling Ba'ath Party feared that Ruhollah Khomeini was attempting to export the Iranian Revolution to Iraq by inciting the latter's Shia-majority population into revolting against the secular and Arab nationalist government. Five days later, the Iraqi military launched a major offensive and invaded Iran, sparking the Iran–Iraq War.

See also

Shatt al-Arab dispute
Iran–Iraq War
Iran–Iraq relations
Arab League–Iran relations

Notes

References

1974 in Iran
1974 in Iraq
Basra Governorate
Disputed territories in the Persian Gulf
Iran–Iraq border
Khuzestan Province
Shatt al-Arab basin
Territorial disputes of Iran
Territorial disputes of Iraq
Wars involving Iran
Wars involving Iraq